Sisca "Chika" Jessica (born April 25, 1988) is an Indonesian actress best known for her work as a co-host in Hitam Putih Talk show hosted by Deddy Corbuzier. She began her career with a role in a soap opera. In 2009, she starred in the movie Merantau with Iko Uwais and Christine Hakim.

Filmography

Television

Saat ini

See also 
 List of Indonesian films

References

External links 
 

1988 births
Living people
People from Bandung
21st-century Indonesian actresses